Mohamed Al-Hashimi (born 1 May 1965) is an Omani sprinter. He competed in the men's 200 metres at the 1984 Summer Olympics.

References

External links
 

1965 births
Living people
Athletes (track and field) at the 1984 Summer Olympics
Omani male sprinters
Olympic athletes of Oman
Place of birth missing (living people)